Santa Mare is a commune in Botoșani County, Western Moldavia, Romania. It is composed of eight villages: Bădărăi, Berza, Bogdănești, Durnești, Ilișeni, Rânghilești, Rânghilești-Deal and Santa Mare.

Natives
 Alexandru Bădărău

References

Santa Mare
Localities in Western Moldavia
Populated places on the Prut